Mohammed Ali Mohsen is a Yemeni  Brigadier in the Yemeni army. He resigned his position as Head of the Eastern Division over the 2011 Yemeni uprising.

References

Living people
Year of birth missing (living people)

Yemeni military officers